Gerard Sutton (born 23 October 1978), is an Australian rugby league referee from Coonabarabran, New South Wales, Australia.

Rugby league career
Sutton made his National Rugby League debut in 2009. He has controlled City vs Country Origin games in 2012 and 2014, the 2014 World Club Challenge and matches in the 2014, 2015, 2016, 2017, 2018, 2019, 2020 and 2021 State of Origin series. Internationally, Sutton controlled matches in the 2014 and 2016 Rugby League Four Nations and the 2015 and 2016 Anzac Tests. He was in the match officials squad for the 2017 Rugby League World Cup of which he officiated the 2017 Rugby League World Cup Final. Sutton also refereed the 2014, 2015, 2017, 2018, 2019, 2020 and 2021 NRL Grand Finals.

References

Australian rugby league referees
National Rugby League referees
Rugby League World Cup referees
Living people
1979 births
21st-century Australian people